There are over 20,000 Grade II* listed buildings in England.  This page is a list of these buildings in the Malvern Hills district in Worcestershire.

Malvern Hills

|}

Notes

References 
English Heritage Images of England

External links

Malvern Hills
 Malvern Hills
Lists of listed buildings in Worcestershire